For My Daughter's Honor (also released as Indecent Seduction) is a 1996 American made-for-television drama film directed by Alan Metzger and starring Gary Cole, Nicholle Tom, Mac Davis and Mary Kay Place. It originally aired on CBS on November 20, 1996.

Plot 
Fourteen-year-old high school student Amy Dustin becomes an object of romantic affection to Pete Nash, the school's biology teacher and football coach. They take a sudden interest in each other, and begin sending each other notes and talking on the telephone. Although Pete has a family, the two begin a secret relationship. People then begin to suspect that Pete and Amy are having an inappropriate relationship.

It is revealed that another reason for the students' gossip is that Pete had trouble in the past concerning an affair with student Missy Ross the previous year, and student Donna Barns the year before that. He denies these allegations when Amy confronts him about the rumors. One night she spends the night at Pete's house because Pete convinced his daughter, Cassie, to invite Amy to a sleepover. During the middle of the night, Pete wakes Amy up and then convinces her to sleep with him. This upsets her but she still feels that she is in love with him.

Meanwhile, Kimberly Jones, one of her best friends, worries about their relationship, thinking it isn't healthy. She reports it to the school's principal Principal Arnet, who dismisses her allegations because he thinks that Kimberly is telling falsehoods and because she is jealous of the attention that Amy has been getting from Pete. Amy is constantly being pursued at school by Pete, who often takes her to a closet in the classroom in order to kiss her. She doesn't like what he is doing and starts spending time with student Cory Wilkins.

One night, she accompanies Cory to the local Founders Day Festival and dances with him. Pete observes her behavior and is infuriated. In front of a crowd of people, he drags Amy away from Cory. Although his actions attract the attention of all the people at the party, no one intervenes. Amy then tries to break off their affair because she is uncomfortable with the manner in which things are moving, but Pete is able to win back her trust. The next day, her father is informed about what happened at the party. Norm confronts him, but Pete convinces him that he was only acting in Amy's best interests because Cory has a bad reputation. Norm is placated somewhat.

While on a camping trip, Amy's friend Kelly catches Pete and Amy kissing. Upon confronting her, Amy tells her about her relationship with her teacher and states that she is in love with Pete. Things become even more difficult and uncomfortable for Amy when her mother, Betty Ann, finds a love letter to her daughter from Pete. She immediately reports it to the high school principal. Matters are complicated because Amy and Pete both deny an affair. For this reason, the principal is unable to do anything about it.

When Amy decides to break off the affair, Pete will not leave her alone and his actions become even more irrational and possessive than they were before. Amy then admits everything to her parents and Pete is arrested. He receives a jail sentence of five months at the local state detention center as well as a 10-year period of probation.

Betty Ann decides to sue the school as well, because the school failed to act in spite of convincing evidence that supported the fact that an affair between a teacher and a student took place. Instead of the students showing sympathy towards Amy, they act hostile towards her because Coach Nash was suspended from his job before an important football game. The fact that her friends think that she was just as much to blame as Pete increases Amy's feelings of rejection and isolation. When the Dustin house is vandalized, Amy considers dropping the case because she feels that the trouble she and her family have had to endure is not worth it. In the end, she changes her mind and decides to go through with it. She is motivated by her strong feelings and does not want someone else to experience what she endured.

Cast
 Gary Cole as Pete Nash
 Nicholle Tom as Amy Dustin
 Mac Davis as Norm Dustin
 Mary Kay Place as Betty Ann Dustin
 Alyson Hannigan as Kelly
 Sara Rue as Kimberly Jones
 Sean Murray as Ralph
 Sheeri Rappaport as Missy Ross
 Ron Melendez as Cory Wilkins
 Tom Virtue as Principal Chuck Arnet

References

External links

Profile on Lifetime

1996 television films
1996 films
1990s teen drama films
CBS network films
American teen drama films
American films based on actual events
Films set in Oklahoma
Films directed by Alan Metzger
American drama television films
1990s English-language films
1990s American films